Pratheeksha is a 1979 Indian Malayalam-language film, directed by Chandrahasan and produced by Sreekumar and Vijayakumar. The film stars Madhu, Mohan Sharma, Adoor Bhavani and Ambika. The film's score was composed by Salil Chowdhary.

Cast 
 
Madhu 
Mohan Sharma 
M. G. Soman 
Bhavani 
Ambika 
Vidhubala 
Thikkurissy Sukumaran Nair 
T. P. Madhavan

Soundtrack 
The music was composed by Salil Chowdhary with lyrics by O. N. V. Kurup.

References

External links
 

1979 films
1970s Malayalam-language films